The 2008 FIA GT Tourist Trophy was the opening round of the 2008 FIA GT Championship season. It took place at Silverstone Circuit, Great Britain, on 20 April 2008. It was the fourth time the RAC Tourist Trophy was held as a round of the FIA GT Championship.

Race results
Class winners in bold.  Cars failing to complete 75% of winner's distance marked as Not Classified (NC).  Cars with a C under their class are running in the Citation Cup, with the winner marked in bold italics.

† – #61 Prospeed Competition was disqualified after the race for failing technical inspection.  The car was found to be below the minimum ride height.

Statistics
 Pole Position – #5 Carsport Holland – 2:14.554
 Average Speed – 155.21 km/h

References
 

Tourist Trophy
Tourist Trophy
RAC Tourist Trophy